Together for Vojvodina may refer to:
 Together for Vojvodina (coalition), a defunct political coalition in Serbia
 Together for Vojvodina (party), a political party in Serbia led by Olena Papuga